Krasny is a rural locality (a settlement) in Krasnoyarskoye Rural Settlement, Chernyshkovsky District, Volgograd Oblast, Russia. The population was 123 as of 2010. There are 4 streets.

Geography 
Krasny is located 11 km southeast of Chernyshkovsky (the district's administrative centre) by road. Bogomazovka is the nearest rural locality.

References 

Rural localities in Chernyshkovsky District